Coprosma fowerakeri is a species of Coprosma found in the South Island of New Zealand described in 2003. It was previously included within C. pseudocuneata.

It was named after the New Zealand botanist Charles Ethelbert Foweraker.

References

External links
Coprosma fowerakeri at the New Zealand Plant Conservation Network

fowerakeri
Flora of New Zealand
Taxa named by Peter James de Lange
Plants described in 2003